Pokoše is a village northeast of Slovenska Bistrica in northeastern Slovenia. The area is part of the traditional region of Styria. It is now included with the rest of the Municipality of Slovenska Bistrica in the Drava Statistical Region.

Mass grave
Pokoše is the site of a mass grave from the period immediately after the Second World War. It contains the remains of civilians from Slovenska Bistrica that were murdered in May 1945 and buried in a former antitank trench.

Cultural heritage
A number of Roman era burial mounds have been identified in the Velenik area south of the main settlement.

References

External links
Pokoše at Geopedia

Populated places in the Municipality of Slovenska Bistrica